Nu Cancri, Latinised from ν Cancri, is a binary star in the zodiac constellation of Cancer. It is faintly visible to the naked eye with an apparent visual magnitude of +5.46. Based upon an annual parallax shift of 8.31 mas as seen from the Earth, the star is located roughly 390 light-years from the Sun.

This is a single-lined spectroscopic binary system with an orbital period of 3.8 years and an  eccentricity of 0.35. The primary, component A, is a white-hued A-type giant star with a stellar classification of A0 III.

References

A-type giants
Cancri, Nu
Cancer (constellation)
BD+25 2029
Cancri, 69
077350
044405
3595
Spectroscopic binaries